Ziar Kola may refer to:
 Ziar Kola, Amol
 Ziar Kola, Simorgh